Robert John McCann  is a Canadian mathematician, known for his work in transportation theory. He has worked as a professor at the University of Toronto since 1998, and as Canada Research Chair in Mathematics, Economics, and Physics since 2020.

Life and work
McCann was raised in Windsor, Ontario. He studied engineering and physics at Queen's University before graduating with a degree in math, and earned a PhD in mathematics from Princeton University in 1994. McCann was a Tamarkin Assistant Professor at Brown University from 1994, before joining the University of Toronto Department of Mathematics in the fall of 1998. He served as editor-in-chief of the Canadian Journal of Mathematics from 2007 to 2016. He was an invited speaker at the International Congress of Mathematicians in Seoul in 2014. He was elected a Fellow of the American Mathematical Society in 2012, of the Royal Society of Canada in 2014, of the Fields Institute in 2015 and of the Canadian Mathematical Society in 2020.

He invented the displacement interpolation between probability measures and studied the convexity of various entropies and energies along it,
later linking these to Ricci curvature and eventually to the Einstein equations of general relativity. He has pioneered applications of optimal transport to economic problems such as hedonic matching, investment to match, and multidimensional screening.

References

External links
 

Year of birth missing (living people)
Applied mathematicians
Living people
20th-century Canadian mathematicians
21st-century Canadian mathematicians
Brown University faculty
Fellows of the American Mathematical Society
Mathematical economists
Mathematical physicists
People from Windsor, Ontario
Princeton University alumni
Queen's University at Kingston alumni
Academic staff of the University of Toronto